The 1995 Canadian Grand Prix was a Formula One motor race held on 11 June 1995 at the Circuit Gilles Villeneuve, Montreal. It was the sixth race of the 1995 Formula One season.

It produced the only Grand Prix victory for French driver Jean Alesi. This was seen as a popular victory, as Alesi had waited over five years for a victory and he was driving the red number 27 Ferrari, as driven by Canadian Gilles Villeneuve. Adding to the victory was the fact that the win also occurred on Alesi's 31st birthday. This race also marked the last time to date that a Grand Prix was won by a car with a V12 engine, as well as the only race of the season won by a non-Renault-powered car.

Michael Schumacher led until a late problem with his gearbox necessitated a long pit stop. Several other regular front-runners had problems, allowing both Jordan drivers to finish on the podium for the first time in the team's history. Jordan had scored their first-ever GP points in Montreal four years earlier.

After Alesi crossed the finish line, race fans broke through the fences and charged the pit area. When Alesi entered the hairpin at the far end of the circuit on his victory lap, his car ran out of fuel, and Alesi removed his steering wheel, stood on top of the car and "surfed" it to a stop. Schumacher, approaching from behind, stopped and gave Alesi a lift back to the pits on top of his car.

Also, that Sunday evening, the first rumours started circulating that Michael Schumacher had signed a multimillion-dollar contract with Ferrari for 1996.

The race was run over 69 laps, but the results were declared after 68 laps because of crowd invasion just after Alesi had finished. In original results, Luca Badoer finished in 7th, ahead of Mika Salo who had stopped next to the pit wall to avoid hitting spectators.

Report

Background
One thing that was noted in the build-up to the race weekend was the bumpiness of the circuit, with the drivers in the post-qualifying press conference noting that the circuit should be resurfaced. It was also noted that overtaking into the new chicane was banned, although the length of the ban was unclear, with Michael Schumacher and Damon Hill unclear whether the drivers were not allowed to overtake into the chicane for just the first lap, or for every lap.

Practice and qualifying
Schumacher's pole position was the 100th for a Renault powered car and the ninth of his career.

Race day
The 30-minute warm-up session was held in wet conditions, with rain constantly falling since the early morning, the first time rain had fallen over the Grand Prix weekend. Hill was one of the few drivers to make a mistake, spinning at the newly installed chicane. Hill's Williams teammate David Coulthard spun at the previous corner later in the session, while Bertrand Gachot also ran into the gravel trap. After a brief stay in the pits, an animated Hill went back onto the track, only to go off into the gravel trap, beaching his car. Due to the changing weather conditions, the order was mixed, with the Ferraris of Jean Alesi and Gerhard Berger in first and third. Rubens Barrichello split them in second, with Schumacher fourth. Mika Häkkinen was fifth. The Saubers of Heinz-Harald Frentzen and Jean-Christophe Boullion were 6th and 7th, with Luca Badoer in the Minardi rounding out the top 8. The two Williams drivers eventually finished in 12th and 16th.

The race started at 14:00 EDT (UTC−4). Michael Schumacher led for most of the race; however, an electrical problem with his Benetton-Renault towards the end of lap 57 forced him into the pits and allowed second-placed Jean Alesi to take the lead. The 70-second pit stop to change a steering wheel and perform an on-board computer adjustment meant that Schumacher rejoined the race in seventh place. He eventually made his way back to fifth place.

Classification

Qualifying

Race

Championship standings after the race

Drivers' Championship standings

Constructors' Championship standings

Note: Only the top five positions are included for both sets of standings.

References 

Canadian Grand Prix
Grand Prix
Canadian Grand Prix
Grand Prix